Route 9 is an American crime drama film released in 1998, directed by David Mackay.

Cast 
 Kyle MacLachlan - Booth Parker
 Peter Coyote - Sheriff Dwayne Hogan
 Amy Locane - Sally Hogan
 Wade Williams - Earl Whitney 
 Miguel Sandoval - Jesse Segundo
 Roma Maffia - Agent Ellen Marks
 Joseph D. Reitman - Cliff
 Scott Coffey - Nate
 Silas Weir Mitchell - Agent Paul Danning
 Chris Murray - Cowboy

Reviews
Emanuel Levy in Variety compares it to "the far more suspenseful, ambiguous and technically accomplished A Simple Plan", the 1998 film directed by Sam Raimi, and states its "gifted ensemble does its best to elevate the suspenser above B-pic level, but after the first reel, pedestrian writing and sluggish helming make it clear that this crimer is destined for the small screen and video."

References

External links 

1998 television films
1998 films
1998 crime drama films
1990s police films
Adultery in films
American crime drama films
Crime television films
Films about police officers
American drama television films
1990s American films